In genealogy, a mirror tree is a family tree reconstructed through estimates of consanguinity.

References 

Genealogy
Genetics